Eric Olauson is a former Canadian politician, who was elected to the Legislative Assembly of Saskatchewan in the 2016 provincial election. He represented the electoral district of Saskatoon University as a member of the Saskatchewan Party until 2020. Prior to his election, he was the Ward 8 councillor on Saskatoon City Council for less than a full term. He served on the Standing Committee For Intergovernmental Affairs and Justice, Standing Committee on Human Services, Standing Committee on Private Bills, Caucus Committee for Municipal Cooperation and the Caucus Management Committee.

Controversies

Drunk Driving
Olauson was one of several candidates during the 2016 election who were previously convicted of drunk driving. Olauson's two convictions were from 1992 and 1993 and were not disclosed during his time as a city councilor.

Social media
Shortly after his election to provincial office, Olauson was reprimanded for his social media activity, which included liking a Facebook post about "slapping the shit" out of political opponents and liking a Facebook page called the "Boobszone." As a result of this, the Sask Party government temporarily ordered Olauson to stay off of social media and removed him from a committee seat.

Background Checks
In April 2017, Olauson was dropped from the board for the Meewasin Valley Authority after it was reported he had ordered a background check on a constituent voicing her concerns regarding cuts to libraries and municipal funding. Olauson had accidentally hit "reply all" instead of just reply when emailing his assistant to instruct her to perform the check. The email stated that his ensuing response would be "epic."

Finances
As the Legislative Secretary to the Minister of Parks, Culture and Sport, Olauson received an additional $3,000 salary top up from the Saskatchewan Party, aside from the base pay for Members of the Legislative Assembly, which is $96,183, despite there being no record or reports of work done in this position.

Prior to his early departure from Saskatoon City Council, Olauson charged the city $440 for four football jerseys, billed as a supposed communication expense. In 2015, he voted against the Saskatoon Municipal Review Commission's proposal to end corporate and union donations, which was rejected in a 7-4 vote by the city council.

Political Views

Abortion
Olauson has participated in the anti-abortion March for Life protests in Ottawa while serving as a provincial MLA. In the 2018 Saskatchewan Party leadership election, Olauson supported Ken Cheveldayoff, who had stated that he doesn't believe rape victims should have legal access to abortion services, earning him the anti-abortion group Right Now's top rank out of the six leadership candidates.

While the Saskatchewan Party caucus debated expanding access to abortion medication, Minister of Health Greg Ottenbreit told an anti-abortion group he would do what he could in his "professional capacity" to block abortion access. It was leaked that Olauson, as chair of the Saskatchewan Party caucus, issued a gag order, telling members to not talk to the media about Ottenbreit's anti-abortion views.

References

Living people
Saskatchewan Party MLAs
Saskatoon city councillors
21st-century Canadian politicians
Year of birth missing (living people)